Fox Kids is a former children's television programming brand.

Fox Kids may also refer to:

 Fox (clothing), a fashion chain featuring a clothing line called Fox Kids